A seasoned equity offering or secondary equity offering (SEO) or capital increase is a new equity issued by an already publicly traded company. Seasoned offerings may involve shares sold by existing shareholders (non-dilutive), new shares (dilutive), or both. If the seasoned equity offering is made by an issuer that meets certain regulatory criteria, it may be a shelf offering.

See also
Initial public offering
Public offering
Reduction of capital
Rights issue
Secondary market offering

External links
UNDERWRITER CHOICE AND ANNOUNCEMENT EFFECTS FOR SEASONED EQUITY OFFERINGS by Fredrick P. Schadler* and Timothy L. Manuel 
Investopedia: Secondary Offering

Corporate finance
Stock market
Equity securities